Edward Jack Roebuck (July 3, 1931 – June 14, 2018) was an American professional baseball relief pitcher and scout, who played in Major League Baseball (MLB) for 11 seasons (–; –) for the Brooklyn / Los Angeles Dodgers, Washington Senators and Philadelphia Phillies. He appeared in the World Series with the Dodgers in 1955 and 1956. He threw and batted right-handed.

Pitching career

Brooklyn
Roebuck was born in East Millsboro, located in the heart of Southwest Pennsylvania's coal mining country. After attending Brownsville Area High School, he began his 19-season playing career in the Dodgers' organization in 1949, and was called to the majors in  after winning 45 games over three years for the Triple-A Montreal Royals. Working out of the Brooklyn bullpen, the rookie got into 47 games, second only to relief ace Clem Labine's 60 games pitched, and posted 12 saves to lead the pennant-winning team. His earned run average was an effective 2.57 as late as July 22, but a succession of rough outings inflated his final ERA for 1955 to a poor 4.71. Roebuck made one appearance in the 1955 World Series against the New York Yankees, pitching two scoreless innings in Game 6 in relief of Russ Meyer in a 5–1 Brooklyn defeat. But the Dodgers came back the next day, October 4, 1955, to win Game 7 and Brooklyn's only world championship, 2–0, behind Johnny Podres' complete game shutout.

The next season, Roebuck had only one save in 43 games and led the National League in wild pitches, while the Dodgers repeated as league champions. In Game 2 of the 1956 World Series, he halted a five-run Yankee rally in the second inning against starting pitcher Don Newcombe by getting Joe Collins to ground out, then left for a pinch hitter in the Dodger half of the inning. Brooklyn scored six runs in that frame and went on to defeat the Yankees 13–8 behind the stellar, seven-inning relief work of Don Bessent. Roebuck made two more appearances, in Games 4 and 7, surrendering a  home run to Mickey Mantle in the former game,  and pitching two shutout innings of mop-up work in the latter, both Yankee victories.

In , the Dodgers' last season in Brooklyn, Roebuck won eight of ten decisions and improved his earned run average to 2.71. He also made his only career MLB start, going five innings on June 5 against the Cincinnati Redlegs and allowing two runs in an eventual 3–0 Dodger defeat.

Los Angeles
His first two seasons as a Dodger in Los Angeles were ruined by a sore arm, then a year-long minor league demotion that cost Roebuck the chance to earn a second World Series ring.

But he rebounded again.

In , he was the Dodgers' most successful bullpen ace, helping them to a first-place tie with their archrival, the San Francisco Giants, after the full slate of 162 games. But Los Angeles dropped the 1962 National League tie-breaker series, two games to one. Roebuck worked in all three games, allowing no runs and only two hits in 4 innings pitched over his first two outings as the teams split, one game apiece. In the decisive third game, officially the 165th regular season contest each team would play in 1962, Roebuck relieved Podres in the sixth inning and held the Giants scoreless for the next three frames, as the Dodgers took a 4–2 lead.

But in the top of the ninth inning, defensive lapses enabled the Giants to claw back against Roebuck. After being struck on the hand by a Willie Mays line drive single back through the box, he left the game with one out, a run in and the bases loaded. His successor on the mound, Stan Williams, then allowed a sacrifice fly to tie the game and issued a bases-loaded walk to give the Giants the lead; an insurance run then scored on an error. San Francisco won the 1962 National League pennant, with Roebuck charged with only his second loss in 12 decisions on the season, although his 64 appearances and ten victories were career bests.

Washington and Philadelphia
Teaming with Philadelphia's bullpen ace, Jack Baldschun, he responded with a standout season for the Phillies, notching 12 saves in 60 appearances and a career-best 2.21 ERA. But a disastrous, late-September losing streak cost the Phillies the National League title. In , Roebuck posted five relief victories and three saves, but his workload and effectiveness diminished.

During his big-league career, Roebuck had a very high winning percentage, compiling a mark of 52 wins and 31 defeats (.627) with seasons of 8–2 (1957), 8–3 (1960) and 10–2 (1962) for the Dodgers. He compiled 62 career saves and an ERA of 3.35. He worked in 460 games, all but one in relief, and in 791 innings pitched, he allowed 753 hits and 302 bases on balls, with 477 strikeouts. A competent batsman, Roebuck collected 28 hits (including two home runs) and batted .204 lifetime in the majors.

Roebuck was also known as one of the game's finest fungo hitters, who endeavored to hit fungo home runs from home plate in every MLB stadium. In 1964, still an active player with the rival Phillies, Roebuck was asked by Roy Hofheinz, owner of the Houston Colt .45s, to hit the highest fungo fly balls he could in order to determine the ideal roof height for baseball's first domed stadium, the Astrodome, still under construction at the time.

Longtime scout
After his playing career ended, Roebuck was a scout for a number of teams, including the Dodgers, Phillies, Atlanta Braves, Cincinnati Reds, Pittsburgh Pirates and Boston Red Sox. He retired in 2004 and died June 14, 2018, at age 86 in Lakewood, California, where he had lived since 1958. He was buried at Forest Lawn Memorial Park (Long Beach).

References

External links

Ed Roebuck at SABR (Baseball BioProject)

1931 births
2018 deaths
Almendares (baseball) players
American people of Polish descent
Atlanta Braves scouts
Baseball players from Pennsylvania
Boston Red Sox scouts
Brooklyn Dodgers players
Cincinnati Reds scouts
Elmira Pioneers players
Fort Worth Cats players
Los Angeles Dodgers players
Los Angeles Dodgers scouts
Major League Baseball pitchers
Montreal Royals players
Newport News Dodgers players
People from Fayette County, Pennsylvania
People from Lakewood, California
Philadelphia Phillies players
Philadelphia Phillies scouts
Pittsburgh Pirates scouts
St. Paul Saints (AA) players
San Diego Padres (minor league) players
Washington Senators (1961–1971) players
American expatriate baseball players in Cuba
American expatriate baseball players in Nicaragua
Burials at Forest Lawn Memorial Park (Long Beach)